Louisville Township is the name of some places in the U.S. state of Minnesota:
Louisville Township, Red Lake County, Minnesota
Louisville Township, Scott County, Minnesota

See also: Louisville Township (disambiguation)

Minnesota township disambiguation pages